Lukas Malicsek (born 6 June 1999) is an Austrian professional footballer who plays as a midfielder for Admira Wacker. His brother Philipp and his cousin Manuel Maranda are also footballers.

References

Living people
1999 births
Austrian footballers
Austria youth international footballers
Austria under-21 international footballers
Austrian people of Hungarian descent
Association football defenders
FC Admira Wacker Mödling players
SV Horn players
Austrian Football Bundesliga players
2. Liga (Austria) players
Austrian Regionalliga players
Footballers from Vienna